The Ilesha (also known as Bolshaya Ilesha and Ilasha) is a river in Verkhnetoyemsky and Krasnoborsky Districts of Arkhangelsk Oblast and in Udorsky District of Komi Republic in Russia. It is a right tributary of the Pinega. The area of its basin . Its main tributary is the Pinegskaya Yentala (left).

The Ilesha flows over the hilly landscape, in the conifer forests (taiga).

The source of the Ilesha is located in the north-eastern part of Verkhnetoyemsky District. The Ilesha initially flows to the south-east, enters briefly Udorsky District, turns south, enters briefly Krasnoborsky District, and then turns south-west and reenters Verkhnetoyemsky District. Upstream of the mouth of the Pinegskaya Yentala the Ilesha is also known as the Malaya Ilesha, which means The Lesser Ilesha. Downstream of the confluence with the Pinegskaya Yentala the Ilesha flows west, and eventually turns north-west. The valley of the Ilesha is very little populated, with the only village of Krasnaya located in the valley, and a number of alone-standing houses seasonally used by hunters. The village of Ust-Ilesha in the mouth of the river has lost all its population and is currently a ghost village.

References 

Rivers of Arkhangelsk Oblast
Rivers of the Komi Republic